James Bernard Neilly  is a BBC broadcaster and sports commentator from Northern Ireland.

He grew up in Merville Garden Village, Whitehouse, Newtownabbey, Northern Ireland.

Formerly a teacher of science in the Belfast Boys' Model School, Neilly joined the BBC as a sports commentator and TV presenter in 1978. He has covered the Commonwealth Games, Olympic Games, Rugby Five Nations' Championship and the Irish Rugby Tours in the Southern Hemisphere, as well as numerous boxing matches. He became Head of Sport and Events for BBC Northern Ireland after eleven years, though continued working as a presenter and commentator on radio and television, and became presenter of Midweek Sportsound.

Moving into freelance commentating in 1993, he became BBC Network Boxing Commentator, succeeding Harry Carpenter. Since 1994 he has commentated on Rugby Union as well as on boxing.

He was the 2013/14 President of the Ulster Reform Club.

Neilly was appointed Member of the Order of the British Empire (MBE) in the 2020 Birthday Honours for services to sports broadcasting and charity in Northern Ireland.

References

Living people
Boxing commentators
British sports broadcasters
Television presenters from Northern Ireland
Irish rugby union commentators
Year of birth missing (living people)
Members of the Order of the British Empire